Ahrweiler is an electoral constituency (German: Wahlkreis) represented in the Bundestag. It elects one member via first-past-the-post voting. Under the current constituency numbering system, it is designated as constituency 198. It is located in northern Rhineland-Palatinate, comprising the Ahrweiler district and the western part of the Mayen-Koblenz district.

Ahrweiler was created for the inaugural 1949 federal election. Since 2009, it has been represented by Mechthild Heil of the Christian Democratic Union (CDU).

Geography
Ahrweiler is located in northern Rhineland-Palatinate. As of the 2021 federal election, it comprises the district of Ahrweiler as well as the municipalities of Andernach and Mayen and the Verbandsgemeinden of Maifeld, Mendig, Pellenz, and Vordereifel from the district of Mayen-Koblenz.

History
Ahrweiler was created in 1949. In the 1949 election, it was Rhineland-Palatinate constituency 2 in the numbering system. In the 1953 through 1976 elections, it was number 149. In the 1980 through 1998 elections, it was number 147. In the 2002 election, it was number 201. In the 2005 election, it was number 200. In the 2009 and 2013 elections, it was number 199. Since the 2017 election, it has been number 198.

Originally, the constituency comprised the districts of Ahrweiler and Mayen. It acquired its current borders in the 1972 election, although the Verbandsgemeinden of Pellenz and Vordereifel were known as Andernach-Land and Mayen-Land, respectively, until 2002.

Members
The constituency has been held continuously by the Christian Democratic Union (CDU) since its creation. It was first represented by Johann Junglas from 1949 to 1953, followed by Otto Lenz until 1957. Johann Peter Josten served from 1957 to 1980. He was succeeded by Karl Deres, who was representative until 1994. Wilhelm Josef Sebastian served from 1994 to 2009. Mechthild Heil was elected in 2009, and re-elected in 2013, 2017, and 2021.

Election results

2021 election

2017 election

2013 election

2009 election

References

Federal electoral districts in Rhineland-Palatinate
1949 establishments in West Germany
Constituencies established in 1949
Ahrweiler (district)
Mayen-Koblenz